"Money Can't Buy" is a song by American recording artist Ne-Yo, released on May 29, 2014 as the first single for his sixth studio album Non-Fiction (2015). The song features American rapper Jeezy and was produced by DJ Montay, Jaytez, D Lumar, and Jesse "Corparal" Wilson.

Track listing
Digital download
"Money Can't Buy" (featuring Jeezy) – 4:13

Charts

Release history

References

2014 singles
2014 songs
Ne-Yo songs
Motown singles
Songs written by Ne-Yo
Songs written by Jeezy
Jeezy songs